Hugh Moffat (24 January 1885 – 14 November 1952) was an English professional footballer who played as a wing half in the Football League for Burnley and Oldham Athletic. He won one cap for the England national team, in a match against Wales on 17 March 1913 and represented the Football League XI.

Personal life 
Moffat was married and had four children, one of whom, Sid, also became a professional footballer. As of 1907, he was working as a coach painter. He served as a private in the Cheshire Regiment, the King's (Liverpool Regiment), the Labour Corps and the Duke of Wellington's (West Riding Regiment) during the First World War and was discharged from the army on 28 May 1918, suffering from chronic nephritis. Moffat was the licensee of a pub in Congleton between 1922 and 1940.

References

1885 births
1952 deaths
People from Congleton
English footballers
England international footballers
Association football wing halves
Burnley F.C. players
Oldham Athletic A.F.C. players
English Football League players
Congleton Town F.C. players
English Football League representative players
Sportspeople from Cheshire
Association football fullbacks
British Army personnel of World War I
Cheshire Regiment soldiers
King's Regiment (Liverpool) soldiers
Royal Pioneer Corps soldiers
Duke of Wellington's Regiment soldiers
English football managers
Congleton Town F.C. managers
Military personnel from Cheshire